The name Holly has been used for two tropical cyclones in the Atlantic Ocean and three in the western Pacific Ocean.

Atlantic Ocean
 Hurricane Holly (1969) – minimal hurricane that moved through the Lesser Antilles as a tropical depression
 Hurricane Holly (1976) – minimal hurricane that remained over open waters

Western Pacific Ocean
 Tropical Storm Holly (1981) (T8103, 03W) – moderate tropical storm which formed and remained fairly close to the equator throughout its duration.
 Typhoon Holly (1984) (T8410, 11W, Huaning) – brought heavy rainfall and caused severe damage to the Korean Peninsula, causing one death
 Super Typhoon Holly (1987) (T8715, 15W) – attained super typhoon status, but remained away from land.

Atlantic hurricane set index articles
Pacific typhoon set index articles